Edward Bury (1616–1700), was an English, ejected Presbyterian minister and clergyman.

Early life
Bury was born in Worcestershire in 1616; he was baptised in Rock, Worcestershire on 8 December. According to Walker, he was originally a tailor, and was put into a home in Great Bolas, Shropshire, in place of a deprived rector. Calamy claims that Bury was a man of learning, educated at Coventry Grammar School and at Oxford, and that before obtaining the rectory of Great Bolas, he had been chaplain to a gentleman's family, as well as an assistant to an elderly minister. He received Presbyterian ordination. He began his ministry in Great Bolas sometime before 1654.

Ministry
In parish records he signs himself 'minister and register' until 1661, when, as a consequence of the act of confirming possession of benefices, he signs 'rector.' His entries suggest that he was interested in astrology. 
Ejected in 1662 after refusing to sign the Act of Uniformity, Bury, who remained at Great Bolas in a house he had built, lived under significant hardship. 
On 2 June 1680, Philip Henry gave him £4, from a sum left at his disposal by William Probyn of Wem. Henry's 22 July 1681 diary entry has an account of the distraint of Bury's goods (he is here called Berry) for taking part in a private fast on 14 June. 
After this, he faced continued persecution and frequently moved location to avoid being caught by authorities. 
In later life, his circumstances were improved by bequests. 
Some years before he died, Bury became blind. 
He died on 5 May 1700, from gangrene in one leg.

Family
By his wife Mary, he had at least five children: 
Edward, b. 1654; 
Margarit (sic), b. 12 Feb. 1655; 
John, b. 14 March 1657; 
Mary, b. 13 Aug. 1660; 
Samuel.

Works
'The Soul's Looking-glass, or a Spiritual Touchstone,' &c., 1660. 
'A Short Catechism, containing the Fundamental Points of Religion,' 1660. 
'Relative Duties.' 
'Death Improv'd, and Immoderate Sorrow for Deceased Friends and Relatives Reprov'd,' 1675; 2nd edit. 1693. 
 'The Husbandman's Companion, containing an 100 occasional meditations, &c., suited to men of that employment,' 1677. 
'England's Bane, or the Deadly Danger of Drunkenness.' 1677. 
'A Sovereign Antidote against the Fear of Death,' 1681, 8vo (in Dr. Williams's library). 
'An Help to Holy Walking, or a Guide to Glory,' 1705.

References

Attribution
; Endnotes:
Walker's Sufferings of the Clergy, 1714, pt. ii. pp. 310, 368
Calamy's Account, 1713, p. 557 seq.
Continuation, 1727, p. 723 seq.
Lee's Diaries and Letters of P. Henry, 1882, pp. 289, 301
Extracts from the Registers of Bolas Magna by Rev. R. S. Turner

1616 births
1700 deaths
Clergy from Worcestershire
Ejected English ministers of 1662
Alumni of the University of Oxford
English chaplains
17th-century English writers
17th-century English male writers
People from Wyre Forest District